is a Japanese voice actress and radio personality born in Yokohama, Japan. She had worked at Aoni Production for 11 years and had worked freelance since April 2011 and it was announced that she transferred to Across Entertainment in August 2011. She graduated from Department of Architecture, Kanto Gakuin University. She is a member of the voice acting unit Drops, which included fellow voice actresses Mariko Kouda, Akemi Kanda, Ai Nonaka and Ryoko Shiraishi and of the voice acting unit SD-Children along with Miyu Matsuki.

Her casting is usually that of a young child, due to her high-pitched voice. She says in her blog's introduction, "My voice hardly changes even if I breathe in the helium gas." Her height was 146 cm (4.79ft), when she was 29 years old. However, when she became 37 years old, her height was 150 cm(4.92ft). On November 21, 2013 she announced her marriage to actor Wataru Mori. On July 13, 2017 she gave birth to her first child, a girl.

Notable filmography
Tanya & Misia in Sci-Fi HARRY (2000)
Botan in Go! Go! Itsutsugo Land (2001)
Akaha Okajima in Kokoro Library (2001)
Yuri Abe in Kasumin (2001)
Chiyo Mihama in Azumanga Daioh (2002)
Bonta-kun in Full Metal Panic? Fumoffu! (2003)
Ebi in Girls Bravo (2004)
Akubi in Akubi Girl (2006)
Asu Yamada in Binbō Shimai Monogatari (2006)
Peach in Demashita! Powerpuff Girls Z (2006)
Nelliel Tu Odelschwanck in Bleach (2007)
Aoi Oribe in Myself ; Yourself
Boa Sandersonia (young) in One Piece (2009)
Naho in Naruto Shippuden (2011)
Chica in Doraemon (2012) 
Sorbe in Shining Hearts: Shiawase no Pan (2012)
Potclean in Hunter × Hunter (2011) (2013)
033H in Space Dandy (2014)
Misato Wakana in My Wife is the Student Council President (2015)
Momotarou in Kamiwaza Wanda (2016)
Japanese crested ibis (Ep. 3, 5, 12) in Kemono Friends (2017)
Keshi in The Morose Mononokean II (2019)
Satan in Police x Heroine Lovepatrina!  (2020)
Dori in Genshin Impact (2022)
Masukuma in The Little Lies We All Tell (2022)
Misako and Coron in Junji Ito Maniac: Japanese Tales of the Macabre (2023)

Unknown date
Culumon (Calumon) in Digimon
Cynthia & Grace in Hanaukyo Maid Team
U.S Army Recruit in Magical Marine Pixel Maritan
Marie in Onegai Teacher and Onegai Twins
Gyokuyo in Juuni Kokki (The Twelve Kingdoms)
Tsubame Tsubakura (Terry) in Battle B-Daman
Fuku in Tenchi Muyo! GXP
Kinkin in Crayon Shin-chan: The Storm Called: The Hero of Kinpoko
Nene Bakugan Battle Brawlers
Dororon, Pine-chan & Kabi Run-Run in Soreike! Anpanman (Go! Anpanman) /Anpanman
Soccer ball in Sensei no Ojikan/Doki Doki School Hours
Eriko in Chibi Maruko-chan
Chiquitita in Shining Force Neo
Daisuke Niwa (Younger Version) in D.N.Angel
PyuPyu in Fushigiboshi no Futagohime
Dengaku Man in Bobobo-bo Bo-bobo
Scarlet Claw in Re:Cutie Honey
ShiroBon/White Bomber in Bomberman Jetters
Ryo in Ninin Ga Shinobuden
Kuniko Touya in Detective School Q
Fuyuno Yoshikawa in Magikano
Laetitia in Madlax
Mayuko Kamikawa in Sola
Lulu (child) in Kamisama Kazoku
Satori Sarutobi in My Bride Is a Mermaid (OVA)
Mafuyu Shimotsuki in Rakka Ryūsui (Drama CD)
Hiruko in Shangri-La
Dacy Dalstrin in Lunia
Gretel in Black Lagoon
Shantak-kun in Haiyore! Nyarko-san (Drama CD)
In-chan and You-chan in The Cosmopolitan Prayers
Desertrians in HeartCatch PreCure!
Puu in Go! Princess PreCure The Movie: Go! Go!! Splendid Triple Feature!!!
Belbel in Petite Princess Yucie
Lavi in Sgt. Frog
Inn Worker in Seto No Hanayome (Ep. 18)
Nami-kozo in GeGeGe no Kitaro
Chiharu Shigeno in MAJOR 5th season
Delusion Eucliwood #3 in Kore wa Zombie Desu ka?
Mike in Sketchbook ~full color'S~
Goemon Hachisuka in The Ambition of Oda Nobuna
Telelin in Tamagotchi!
Oshiri Kajiri Mushi XVIII in Oshiri Kajiri Mushi
Peacock in Skullgirls

Dubbing
I Am Sam (Lucy Diamond Dawson (Dakota Fanning))

CD

Singles
Tomodachi no umi (Culumon in Digimon)
The Biggest Dreamer (Culumon in Digimon)
Sekai ha NEOHAPPY (Azumanga Daioh character CD Vol.1 Chiyo Mihama)
Nemurihime (Sleeping beauty) (DROPS)
Koi no American football (DROPS)
Furarekibunde Rock'n' Roll (DROPS)
Musumegokoro★Otomegokoro / Sports shimasyo♥ (SD★Children)
Ai no Senko (SD★Children)
Sai Trichromatic
BLEACH BEAT COLLECTION 3rd SESSION: 05 NEL TU
Aoitori (Bluebird) (Myself ; Yourself character songs Vol.5 Aoi Oribe)
Warunai fever
The Ambition of Nobuna Oda - Utahime 01 Music of the different world (Hachisuka Goemon in OdaNobuna No Yabou)

Soundtracks
Digimon timers song Carnival (Culumon in Digimon)
Azumanga Daioh original Soundtrack vol.2  (Chiyo Mihama)
Hanaukyo Maid-tai La Verite Drama CD Morning hen
Caramel! Police Academy character songs
GROW LANSER IV original character song Albums
Myself;Yourself~Audio Drama CD~
Guardian Hearts power up ! Sound Collection (SD★Children)

Albums
CAN DROPS (DROPS)
Hyakka SAY!RUN! Josei seiyū hen II (百歌声爛 －女性声優編II－) SVWC-7526
Rune Princess Vocal Album
W -Wish- character mini Album 3 Tomo & Saika
Miyu Matssuki & Tomoko Kaneda RADIO DEKOPIN night anniversary disc  (松来未祐と金田朋子のRADIOデコピンないと anniversary disc)
CD □□□(Kuchi-Ro-Ro)

Online game songs
Twenty-Two (STREET GEARS)

Stage
  Gekidan-TENNEN-KOBO Ope-nimo-makezu (16–20 September 2010 )
  Gekidan-TENNEN-KOBO Peach Boys (8–12 June 2011)

Radio
Radio Dot I: Tomoko Kanada's mini-mini-micro kindergarten
ES Hour Radio no Ojikan
Tomoko Kanada's mini-mini-micro electronic kindergarten
Club AT-X Yappari Anime ga suki.
Miyu Matssuki & Tomoko Kaneda RADIO DEKOPIN night 
Cyoo・ULTRA Super-mania new Radio wish group
DROPS senpercent
Miyu Matssuki & Tomoko Kaneda RADIO DEKOPIN night 2 
Super-dash station Mai Nakahara & Tomoko Kanada's heat Radi
Nijichiu Parade
Miyu Matssuki & Tomoko Kaneda RADIO DEKOPIN night 2.5 
Pixel Maritan peacekeeping RADIO 
Miyu Matssuki & Tomoko Kaneda RADIO DEKOPIN night SP 
Tomoko Kaneda & Makoto Yasumura's Air radio
Tomoko Kaneda's Tobidoogu
Faito ippatsu! Jûden chan!! Tensai Puragu no Genki ga deru Radio!!

References

External links
 
 
Tomoko Kaneda at Ryu's Seiyuu Infos

1973 births
Living people
Across Entertainment voice actors
Japanese bloggers
Japanese video game actresses
Japanese voice actresses
Kanto Gakuin University alumni
Voice actresses from Yokohama
Japanese women bloggers